Mark Adrian Blenkarne (born 1957), is a male retired archer who competed for Great Britain and England.

Archery career
Blenkarne represented Great Britain in the 1980 Summer Olympics. He represented England and won a gold medal in the men's individual event, at the 1982 Commonwealth Games in Brisbane, Queensland, Australia.

References

1957 births
English male archers
Commonwealth Games medallists in archery
Commonwealth Games gold medallists for England
Archers at the 1982 Commonwealth Games
Archers at the 1980 Summer Olympics
Olympic archers of Great Britain
Living people
20th-century English people
Medallists at the 1982 Commonwealth Games